The cat gap is a period in the fossil record of approximately 25 million to 18.5 million years ago in which there are few fossils of cats or cat-like species found in North America. The cause of the "cat gap" is disputed, but it may have been caused by changes in the climate (global cooling), changes in the habitat and environmental ecosystem, the increasingly hypercarnivorous trend of the cats (especially the nimravids), volcanic activity, evolutionary changes in dental morphology of the Canidae species present in North America, or a periodicity of extinctions called van der Hammen cycles.

Cat evolution

All modern carnivorans, including cats, evolved from miacoids, which existed from approximately 66 to 33 million years ago. There were other earlier cat-like species but Proailurus (meaning "before the cat"; also called "Leman's Dawn Cat"), which appeared about 30 million years ago, is generally considered the first "true cat". 

The increase in disparity through the early Miocene occurs during a time when few feliform fossils have been found in North America. The hypercarnivorous nimravid feliforms were extinct in North America after 26 Ma and felids did not arrive in North America until the Middle Miocene with the appearance of Pseudaelurus. Pseudaelurus crossed over to North America by way of the Bering land bridge from surviving populations in Asia 18.5 million years ago. All modern-day cats are descended from Pseudaelurus.

Nimravids and barbourofelids were saber-toothed cat-like animals of the families Nimravidae and Barbourofelidae, respectively. Although not "true cats" of the family Felidae, they are closely related to felids. The Nimravidae are either basal feliforms or a sister group to both feliforms and caniforms, while the Barbourofelidae are a sister group to the Felidae. Physically, some Nimravidae and Barbourofelidae resembled the saber-toothed cat Smilodon, which would not appear until many millions of years later. Nimravidae also became extinct in North America during the "cat gap".

Possible causes

Hypercarnivorous tendency
The history of carnivorous mammals is characterized by a series of rise-and-fall patterns of diversification, in which declining clades are replaced by phylogenetically distinct but functionally similar clades. Over the past 50 million years, successive clades of small and large carnivorous mammals diversified and then declined to extinction. In most instances, the cause of the decline was energetic constraints and pervasive selection for larger size (Cope's rule) that lead to hypercarnivory dietary specialization. Hypercarnivory leads to increased vulnerability to extinction.

The nimravids were large cat-like animals that occupied this ecomorphic niche in the ecosystem until 26 Ma. It is highly likely that their hypercarnivory led to their extinction in North America. After the extinction of the nimravids there were no other feliform or felid-like species until other felids arrived from Eurasia after crossing the Bering land bridge 18.5 million years ago. During this time there was great diversity among the other carnivorous mammals in North America – both hypocarnivorous and hypercarnivorous species – and other hypercarnivorous species existed before, during, and after the cat gap.

Changes in climate and habitat

Another possible explanation for the extinction of feliforms in North America is changes in the ecology of the continent. Evidence from the geologic temperature record shows that the earth was experiencing a period of global cooling, causing forests to give way to savannas. Climatic changes to arid conditions that muted variation at about 25.8 Ma coincides with the first appearance of hoglike creodonts and of pocket gophers, and this also is the beginning of the "cat gap" and the "entelodont gap", a period of some 7 million years when there were no nimravids, felids, or entelodonts in North America. Faunal overturn at 25.8 Ma is the basis for division of the Arikareean time period (30.5–19 Ma), and the Arikareen NALMA (North American Land-Mammal Ages), into the Monroecreekian period (29.5–25.8 Ma), and then the Harrisonian period (25.8–23.5 Ma).

Other
Volcanic activity has also been promoted as a possible cause of the cat gap as well as other extinctions during this time period. The La Garita Caldera is a large volcanic caldera located in the San Juan Mountains in southwestern Colorado, United States, and is one of a number of calderas that formed during a massive ignimbrite flare-up in Colorado, Utah, and Nevada during the Oligocene Epoch. The La Garita Caldera was the site of the Fish Canyon eruption, an enormous eruption about 27 million years ago. The resulting explosive volcanism probably ejected large amounts of dust and debris into the stratosphere causing major cooling (see volcanic winter). Climatic effects could also have been caused by sulphur ejected into the stratosphere, which rapidly converts to sulphuric acid, an aerosol which cools the troposphere by blocking incoming solar radiation.

Another possible cause of the cat gap could have been the Late Cenozoic Ice Age that began 33.9 million years ago. This ice age caused glaciation in Antarctica that eventually spread to Arctic regions of southern Alaska, Greenland, and Iceland. Glaciers on the North American continent, as well as the cooling trend, could have made the ecosystem uninhabitable for feliformia cat-like species, although habitable for cold-weather caniformia species such as canids (dog-like species), mustelids (weasel-like species), and ursids (bear-like species).

Evolution of caniforms during the gap

It has been suggested by some that as a result of the cat gap caniforms (dog-like species including canids, bears, weasels, and other related taxa) evolved to fill more carnivorous and hypercarnivorous ecological niches that would otherwise have been filled by cats. This conclusion, however, is disputed.

However, other paleontologists take issue with this conclusion:

References

Extinction events
Felids
Gap
Gaps in the fossil record